The Dennis Gabor Award, named after  Hungarian-British electrical engineer and physicist Dennis Gabor, can refer to:
 the Gabor Medal of the Royal Society
 the Dennis Gabor Medal and Prize of the Institute of Physics
 the Dennis Gabor Award in Diffractive Optics of the SPIE
 the International Dennis Gabor Award of the NOVOFER Foundation of the Hungarian Academy of Sciences